Ischiopsopha jamesi are beetles from the family Scarabaeidae, subfamily Cetoniinae, tribe Schizorhinini.

Description
Ischiopsopha jamesii can reach a length of about 32 mm. These beetles have an electric green and blue colour with a red-orange transversal band in the middle of elytra. They have the tip of the scutellum visible.

Distribution
This species can be found in Papua New Guinea.

References

Cetoniinae
Beetles described in 1876